Wesam Rizik Abdulmajid (born 5 February 1981) is a Qatari former footballer. He has Jordanian, Palestinian origin, currently in charge of Qatar SC in Qatar Stars League.

International career
Rizik has appeared for the senior Qatar national football team in 111  matches 
.

Personal life
Rizik got married in December 2011. Also in 2011, he was appointed as the first ambassador of Al Sadd's social responsibility program, "180 Degree Change", which is the first of its kind in the Gulf [sic] region.

See also
 List of men's footballers with 100 or more international caps

References

External links
Player profile - doha-2006.com
-Qatar football

1981 births
Living people
Qatari footballers
Qatar international footballers
2004 AFC Asian Cup players
2007 AFC Asian Cup players
Palestinian footballers
Al Sadd SC players
Qatar SC players
Al-Khor SC players
El Jaish SC players
Qatar SC managers
Qatar Stars League managers
2011 AFC Asian Cup players
Qatar Stars League players
Qatari football managers
Naturalised citizens of Qatar
Sportspeople from Kuwait City
Palestinian emigrants to Qatar
Qatari people of Palestinian descent
Qatari people of Jordanian descent
Asian Games medalists in football
Footballers at the 2002 Asian Games
Footballers at the 2006 Asian Games
FIFA Century Club
Asian Games gold medalists for Qatar
Association football midfielders
Medalists at the 2006 Asian Games